The Death by Stereo/Ensign split 7-inch EP was released by Indecision Records in December 2000. It was an interesting release because both bands had left the label. Ensign in 1998 to go to Nitro Records, and Death by Stereo to go to Epitaph Records. At the time, Death by Stereo were recording material for their new studio release, Day of the Death, and Ensign were in New York City producing an EP for Nitro Records, For What It's Worth. They both agreed to record extra tracks for release by the label which had arguably launched their careers.

In line with Indecision Records custom, they released the 7-inch in limited numbers, 1517 on black vinyl and 480 on brown vinyl. All five tracks were later re-released by Indecision Records on a CD compilation of some of their back catalogue of split EPs. It was called Indecision Records Split Series and was released in April 2001.

Overview
Death by Stereo's contribution commenced with a 54-second, almost death metal blast called "Hippie Holocaust". It finished with a 57-second reprise called "Emo Holocaust", which was almost exactly the same, but with flourishes and a guitar solo. The lyrics were identical, both attacking sections of modern music culture, with the exception of the line, "Hippie holocaust, your blood is mine" which was changed to "Emo holocaust, your sweater can't save you now!". Not that the lyrics were actually deciperhable. The track in between, "From the Minds of Sick People" was very much akin to material from Day of the Death, but could have fitted into either that or their debut album.

Ensign's first track, "Never Go Home Again", was eventually re-recorded for their Nitro Records swansong, The Price of Progression. That and the other track, "Basic, Simple, True", were both in the mould of Ensign's new, more metalcore direction.

Track listing

Death by Stereo side
 All songs by Death by Stereo
"Hippie Holocaust" – 0:54
"From the Minds of Sick People" – 2:24
"Emo Holocaust" – 0:57

Ensign side
 All songs by Ensign
"Never Go Home Again" – 1:57
"Basic, Simple, True" – 2:14

Credits

Death by Stereo
 Efrem Schulz – vocals
 Jim Miner – guitar
 Dan Palmer – guitar
 Paul Miner – bass
 Tim Bender – drums
 Recorded in June 2000 at For the Record and Death Tracks
 Engineered by Paul Miner
 Assistant engineered by Sergio Chavez

Ensign
 Tim "Lil' Timmy DMS" Shaw – vocals
 Nate "Edge" Gluck – guitar, bass, backing vocals
 John "Vince Vegas" O'Neill – drums
 Recorded in June 2000 at Spin Recording Studios, Long Island, New York
 Produced by Nate "Edge" Gluck
 Engineered by Nik Chinboukas
 Assistant engineered by Pete Benjamin

All tracks
 Mastered by Paul Miner at QMark, February 2001

References

External links
Indecision Records
Epitaph Records
Nitro Records

2000 EPs
Ensign (band) EPs
Death by Stereo EPs
Indecision Records EPs